Burgu may refer to:

 Burğu, Azerbaijan
 Bùrgu, the local name of Borgo Val di Taro, Emilia, Italy
 , the name of the Wadai Empire in the Fur language
 Bourgou (grass) (Echinochloa stagnina)
 the tuning peg of a Turkish bağlama

See also
 Burgui
 Burgus